Gibberula agapeta is a species of sea snail, a marine gastropod mollusk, in the family Cystiscidae.

References

agapeta
Gastropods described in 1886
Cystiscidae